The Lake Karrinyup Bowl was a golf tournament held in Australia in 1963 and 1964. The events were held at Lake Karrinyup Country Club, Karrinyup, Western Australia. Total prize money was A£3,000.

Winners

References

Golf tournaments in Australia
Golf in Western Australia
Recurring sporting events established in 1963
Recurring events disestablished in 1964